Dear OhMyGirl is the eighth extended play (EP) by South Korean girl group Oh My Girl. It was released on May 10, 2021, by WM Entertainment and distributed by Sony Music. The album contains six songs including the lead single, "Dun Dun Dance".

Background and release
Oh My Girl released their seventh EP Nonstop in April 2020. The EP spawned two singles, "Nonstop" and "Dolphin", both of which became commercially successful in South Korea, earning platinum certifications from the Korea Music Content Association (KMCA). On April 16, 2021, the group's label WM Entertainment announced that Oh My Girl would be releasing a new EP the following month. The album's title Dear OhMyGirl was revealed on April 19. A promotion schedule for the mini-album was uploaded to the group's social media accounts three days later. 

The first track teaser film was released on April 25. The first concept image teaser was uploaded the next day. The teasers feature each group member dressed in denims, holding transparent umbrellas against a rainy backdrop. The full tracklist of the album was revealed on April 27. On April 28, a second track teaser film was uploaded by the group. A third track film was released two days later. The second set of concept image photos were released on May 2. The teasers show the members dressed in floral printed outfits, against the backdrop of sofas and curtains. A fourth track teaser film was uploaded by the group on May 3. On May 4, the group uploaded an image containing a portion of lyrics of the lead single "Dun Dun Dance". The group released a medley teaser, previewing all six tracks on the album the following day. A track film for the lead single was released on May 6. The final set of concept image teasers was released on May 7. On May 8, the fifth and the final track teaser film was uploaded. The music video teaser of "Dun Dun Dance" was released on May 9. The album was released on May 10, in both CD and digital formats. A music video for "Dun Dun Dance" was released the same day. The video features Oh My Girl dancing to the track on an open green field and has a sci-fi-inspired theme.

Production and composition
The album opener and lead single "Dun Dun Dance" was written by Seo Ji-eum of Jam Factory, who co-wrote "Nonstop", with producers Scott Stoddart and Ryan S. Jhun, and composer Anna Timgren. "Dun Dun Dance" is a nu-disco song with a dynamic rhythm and an alternating funk and trap beat. It features retro instrumentation, vocal harmonies, and a dance-pop style refrain. "Dear You" is pop song with 8-bit synth flourishes, and has warm, comforting lyrics. "My Doll" has lyrics written by Jung Yoon-hwa, and has a dream-pop sound. "Quest" is a trap-style song characterized by bouncing instrumental elements, 808 drums, 8-bit synth effects, and multiple vocal changes. It was produced by Ryan S. Jhun, Jeppe London Bilsby, and Lauritz Emil Christiansen, with lyrics co-written by member Mimi. "Invitation" is a bossa nova song featuring an electric guitar  over a trap-style beat. "Swan" was described as having "dreamy" lyrics with rock beats and a drop section.

Promotion
On May 10, Oh My Girl held an online comeback showcase where they performed songs from the album for the first time. A choreography video for "Dun Dun Dance" was released on May 11. Oh My Girl began promoting the album on music programs, starting with M! Countdown on May 13.

Track listing

Charts

Weekly charts

Year-end charts

Accolades

References

2021 EPs
Korean-language EPs
Oh My Girl albums
Sony Music EPs